Wes McKinley (born March 5, 1945) is an American politician who served in the Colorado House of Representatives from the 64th district from 2005 to 2013.

References

1945 births
Living people
Democratic Party members of the Colorado House of Representatives